Buttermere is a lake in the Lake District in North West England. The adjacent village of Buttermere takes its name from the lake. Historically in Cumberland, the lake is now within the county of Cumbria. Owned by the National Trust, it forms part of its Buttermere and Ennerdale property.

Geography
It is situated towards the head of the valley of the River Cocker and is surrounded by fells, notably the High Stile range to the south west, Robinson to the north-east, Fleetwith Pike and Haystacks to the south-east and Grasmoor to the north-west.

The village of Buttermere stands at the north-western end of the lake, and beyond this is Crummock Water. Access is by road, from Cockermouth in the north-west; from Borrowdale via the Honister Pass; or from Braithwaite and the Newlands Valley via Newlands Hause.

Etymology
There are two possible origins for the name "Buttermere":

One, that Buttermere means "the lake by the dairy pastures" (from the Old English "butere mere"). Whaley suggests this as the correct interpretation:  " 'butter lake, the lake with good pasture-land', from OE 'butere' 'butter', conveying the fertile nature of the flat alluvial land at both ends of the lake, plus 'mere' 'lake',..."

Two, that it is the corrupt form of a personal name. Robert Ferguson asserts in his 1866 work, "The Northmen in Cumberland and Westmoreland" that Buttermere derives from the Old Norse personal name "Buthar", as in "Buthar's mere" (lake). This accords with local tradition, which says that the valley of Buttermere was part of the holdings of an 11th-century Norse chieftain called "Buthar" (sometimes spelt "Boethar"). Large numbers of Vikings settled in the Cumbrian area during the 9th and 10th centuries and many names in the area are of Norse origin: streams are termed 'becks', from the Old Norse bekkr; mountains are 'fells', from the Norse fjall; waterfalls are forces, from fos; ravines are 'gills'; valleys are 'dales', from dalr (ON); and small lakes are termed 'tarns', which derives from tjorn, meaning teardrop. Whaley suggests that the personal name interpretation is incorrect, but notes that the Victoria County History "deemed it 'not disputed that the family of the Scotic ruler, Bueth or Boet, held its own against the Norman intruder', with possession of the barony of Gillesland, for fifty years after the Norman Conquest."

See article on Buttermere at the English Lakes.com website.

History
From his hidden stronghold at Buttermere, it is said that Jarl Buthar conducted a campaign of running resistance against the Norman invaders, from the time of William the Conqueror's Harrying of the North in 1069 right up until the early 12th century. In 1072 King William set up a garrison at Carlisle, but the isolated garrison needed constant reinforcement and supplies. It is claimed that the Cumbrians fought a guerrilla war against the Normans for almost half a century, attacking supply wagons, ambushing patrols and inflicting great losses upon them in terms of money, material and men.

The extent to which Jarl Buthar is a semi-mythological figure is unclear. He is apparently mentioned in 12th-century Norman documents, but much of his story appears to be based on local legend and archaeology, later enhanced by Nicholas Size's popular dramatised history (see below).

Jarl Boethar's campaign and a final battle at Rannerdale (c.f. Ferguson, "Ragnar's dale") between the Normans and the Anglo-Scandinavian Cumbrians led by the Jarl is the subject of a dramatised history by Nicholas Size, called The Secret Valley: The Real Romance of Unconquered Lakeland, published in 1930.

Rosemary Sutcliff's YA novel Shield Ring, published in 1956, imagines the lives of Jarl Buthar and his band of Cumbrian rebels, and their last stand against the forces of a Norman army under the command of Ranulf le Meschin, Lord of Carlisle and later Earl of Chester, nearly 50 years after the Norman Conquest of England in 1066. It was clearly inspired by Nicholas Size's history, which it closely follows.

Mary Robinson (1778–1837), known as the "Maid of Buttermere" and the subject of Melvyn Bragg's novel of that name, was the daughter of the landlord of the Fish Inn in Buttermere village.

References

External links

Buttermere information at the National Trust.
Buttermere Illustrated Guide to the Lake District
The Cumbria Directory - Buttermere - Lake
The History of Dufton Village A useful short history of the Lakeland area from prehistoric times to the late 14th century, Contains references to Jarl Buthar and the Cumbrian resistance movement.
 Robert Ferguson "The Northmen in Cumberland and Westmoreland", pub. 1866, a scholarly etymology which comprehensively examines the influence of the Old Norse language and personal names on the place-names of the Cumbrian area.

Lakes of the Lake District
Sites of Special Scientific Interest in Cumbria
Cumberland
Buttermere, Cumbria (village)